Modern Primitives may refer to:

 Modern primitive, a person in modern society who engages in body modification with ritual purpose
 Modern Primitive (album), a 2016 studio album by Steve Vai
 Modern Primitives (book), a 1989 book by V. Vale and Andrea Juno
 "Modern Primitives" (The Grim Adventures of Billy & Mandy), episode 4a of season 5 (2006)